Pierre Mendès-France University (UPMF, also known as Grenoble II) was a French university, based in Grenoble, focused on social sciences. It was named after the late French politician Pierre Mendès-France. It is now part of the Université Grenoble Alpes.

Its campus was located mainly in Grenoble, with some facilities outside the city, in particular in Valence.

It was established in 1339 as part of University of Grenoble. In 1970 following a fate of many big French universities, University of Grenoble was separated into three specialized institutions – Pierre Mendès-France University (social science), Joseph Fourier University (science and technology), and Stendhal University (languages).

Starting 2013 there has been some movement towards reconciliation. Pierre Mendès-France University, two of its counterparts, and several other institutions reunited in the beginning of 2016 to restore the original university under the name of the Université Grenoble Alpes, which is now alma mater for over 45 000 students.

See also
 List of public universities in France by academy

References

Universities and colleges in Grenoble
Universities in Auvergne-Rhône-Alpes
Grenoble Alpes University
Educational institutions established in 1970
Educational institutions disestablished in 2015
1970 establishments in France
2015 disestablishments in France
Defunct universities and colleges in France